Denis Alex Rusu (born 21 March 2001) is a Romanian professional footballer who plays as an attacking midfielder for Liga III club Șoimii Lipova, on loan from CFR Cluj.

References

External links
 

2001 births
Living people
People from Bihor County
Romanian footballers
Romania youth international footballers
Association football midfielders
Liga I players
Liga III players
FC UTA Arad players
CFR Cluj players